Ispend, Aspand or Isfahan was the son of Qara Yusuf and ruled over Baghdad and its environs for twelve years.

During reign of Qara Yusuf 
His first mention was in 1410, when he commanded left flank of Kara Koyunlu army against Ahmad Jalayir. He was ruling Adilcevaz when his father died.

During reign of Qara Iskander 
He retreated to Chukhur Saad province (later Erivan) where the Saadlu tribe, one of the main sub-tribes of the Kara Koyunlu swore fealty to him and presented him state treasure. He later submitted to Qara Iskander in 1421. Soon Shahrukh crossed the Aras River and battling the forces of Iskander and Ispend at Yakhsi (28 July 1421 - 1 August 1421). Timurid forces were almost defeated when Amir Shahmalik cut heads of two slain soldiers and tricked both into thinking his brother was killed. Iskander's forces retreated to Kirkuk. Ispend used this opportunity to seize Tabriz. However soon retreated to Avnik upon arrival of Qara Iskander.

Reign in Baghdad 
In October 1431 he was invited to Hillah by Jalayirid amirs, a city ruled by Husain II (grandson of Ahmad Jalayir). Hussain was hunted down and killed on 9 November 1431, thus ending latest remnant of Jalayirid Sultanate. He soon captured Baghdad, forcing his half-brother Shah Muhammad to flee. Upon establishing himself in Baghdad, he ordered to struck coins in his own name.

When Qara Iskander killed in 1435, he accepted many refugees including his nephews and nieces - Alvand Mirza, Malik Qasim, Asad, Rustam, Tarkhan, Malik Muhammad, Arayish begum and Shahsaray begum.

He decided to invade Anatolia in 1437, but was defeated by Aq Qoyunlu chief Hamza beg (Qara Osman's son).

Death and succession 
He died on 8 March 1445, bequeathing his kingdom on his nephew, Alvand Mirza since his son Fulad Mirza was too young at the time. However, most of the emirs preferred Fulad.

References

Sources 

 Sümer, Faruk (1984). Kara Koyunlular (in Turkish). Ankara: Türk Tarih Kurumu
 Hasan beg Rumlu - Aḥsan at-tawārīḫ (in Azerbaijani) Kastamonu: Uzanlar, 2017 

1445 deaths
15th-century monarchs in Asia
Year of birth unknown
Qara Qoyunlu rulers